Hummingbird is the second studio album by American indie rock band Local Natives, released on January 29, 2013 on Frenchkiss Records in the US, and on Infectious Records in Europe. Produced by The National guitarist Aaron Dessner, the album was preceded by the singles, "Breakers" and "Heavy Feet." "Breakers" reached #12 on the Billboard Top 200. The song "Mt. Washington" was also featured in the 2015 video game Life Is Strange.

Background and recording
In 2011, bass guitarist Andy Hamm departed from the band, with the remaining members deciding to continue as a four-piece. Regarding his departure, vocalist and keyboardist Kelcey Ayer stated, "Parting with Andy was really hard for us," while vocalist and guitarist Taylor Rice elaborated, stating, "It definitely put us in an uncomfortable place, so that we could try new things. With the first record, we were so concerned with making sure we could do everything live, but with this one there was a cool kind of freedom to be like, 'Let's just try stuff.'"

While on tour with The National, the band became close with guitarist Aaron Dessner, who subsequently asked if he could produce their next studio album. Drummer Matt Frazier noted, "One night, after maybe drinking a little bit too much, he was like, 'Maybe I should work with you guys.' We were like, 'Sure, buddy.' After meeting with all these other producers, it just seemed like we should work with somebody we really get along with and respect as a songwriter." The band relocated to Dessner's home in New York City, with vocalist and keyboardist Kelcey Ayer, stating "It was awesome because we stayed upstairs on the two top floors, and he and his family are downstairs, and the studio is in the back. It's this really tiny space, but it was so convenient to us."

Writing and composition
The album's lyrical content was inspired by the recent death of Kelcey Ayer's mother and the departure of bassist Andy Hamm, with Ayer noting, "[My mother's passing] was definitely really hard, [that] and the Andy thing and there were also relationship issues and weird stuff that impacted the record and the mood of it and what we sang about. We didn’t set out to make a darker or sadder record, but we always write, for the most part, based on our experiences, so it’s a kind of window into the last few years."

Critical reception

Hummingbird received positive reviews from critics. At Metacritic, which assigns a normalized rating out of 100 to reviews from mainstream critics, the album received an average score of 77, based on 32 reviews, which indicates "generally favorable reviews".

Philip Cosores of Paste praised the album, stating, "Local Natives are frank in their presentation of a serious album, challenging listeners to heal along with them; cognizant that investment is proportional to remuneration". Larry Fitzmaurice of Pitchfork concluded that, "With Hummingbird, Local Natives have made a thoughtful, lovely album with small gestures that provide great rewards". CMJs review states that "they were scratching at the surface of their emotional capabilities on their debut. With Hummingbird, Local Natives show that they can dig deeper".

Will Butler of The A.V. Club stated that it "is an album of hidden rewards, a record to pick and choose tracks from in order to purvey a single feeling or contribute to the perfect mixtape. What it’s not, though, is a cohesive, compelling whole". Magnet offered a critique of the album, stating "Unwilling or unable to ascend the vertiginous heights of 2009 debut Gorilla Manor, Hummingbird instead buries its beak in the sand."

Track listing
All songs written by Local Natives; "Heavy Feet", "Breakers", and "Wooly Mammoth" co-written by Aaron Dessner. All tracks produced by Local Natives and Aaron Dessner; "Mt. Washington" also produced by Raymond Richards.

Personnel
Credits adapted from the album's liner notes.

Local Natives
 Taylor Rice – lead vocals, rhythm guitar, bass guitar
 Kelcey Ayer – lead vocals, keyboards, piano, percussion, rhythm guitar, harmonium, glockenspiel
 Ryan Hahn – lead guitar, bass guitar, keyboards, backing vocals, mandolin
 Matt Frazier – drums, percussion

Additional musicians
 Aaron Dessner – additional guitar  claps, additional bass , additional organ , bass , tambourine, bass pedals, organ, MS-20, horn arrangement 
 Raymond Richards – upright bass 
 Yuki Numata – violin 
 Beth Meyers – viola 
 Clarice Jensen – cello 
 Dave Nelson – trombone 
 Bryce Dessner – string and horn arrangement 

Production
 Local Natives – production, art direction, pre-production
 Aaron Dessner – production, engineering, recording, additional pre-production
 Marcus Paquin – engineering 
 Peter Katis – mixing 
 Greg Georgio – additional mixing 
 Raymond Richards – production, engineering 
 Mike Post – engineering 
 Jonathan Low – mixing 
 Brian McTear – mixing 
 Bennett Paster – additional recording

References

2013 albums
Local Natives albums
Frenchkiss Records albums
Albums produced by Aaron Dessner
Infectious Music albums